The 2013-14 Under-21 Premier League Cup (known as the Barclays Under-21 Premier League Cup for sponsorship reasons) was the first edition of the U21 Premier League Cup.

Fifty two teams entered the competition - with sixteen Category 3 EPPP teams entered in the 1st Qualifying Round, seventeen Category 2 teams entered in the 2nd Qualifying Round, and the remaining nineteen Category 1 teams entered in the Round of 32. Teams were allowed to field up to four over-age players in matches – three outfield and one goalkeeper.

Participants

Category 1

Category 2

Category 3

Matches

First qualifying round
This round commences the week beginning 23 September 2013. Only the sixteen Category 3 rated academies competed in this round.

Northern Section

Southern Section

Second qualifying round
This round commenced the week beginning 21 October 2013. The eight First Qualifying Round winners were joined in this round by sixteen of the seventeen Category 2 rated academies - Nottingham Forest drew a bye to the Round of 32.

Northern Section

Southern Section

† – After extra time

Round of 32
This round begins the week beginning 18 November 2013. The nineteen Category 1 sides were joined in this round by the twelve Second Qualifying round winners and Nottingham Forest, who drew a bye to this round. Birmingham City withdrew from the competition after fielding an ineligible player. Newcastle United progressed to the Round of 16 instead.

Northern Section

Southern Section

† – After extra time.

Round of 16
This round commenced the week beginning 16 December 2013. The sixteen Round of 32 winners entered this round.

Quarter-finals
This round commenced the week beginning 27 January 2014. The eight Round of 16 winners entered this round.

† – After extra time.

Semi-finals
This round commenced the week beginning 24 February 2014. The four Quarter-final winners entered this round.

Final

First leg

Second leg

References 

Premier League Cup (football)
Under-21